Matov Peak is the ice-covered peak rising to 1635 m on Topola Ridge in the northwest foothills of Detroit Plateau on Davis Coast in Graham Land, Antarctica.  The feature has steep and partly ice-free west and south slopes.

The peak is named after Hristo Matov (1872-1922), a leader of the Bulgarian liberation movement in Macedonia.

Location
British mapping in 1978.

Maps
British Antarctic Territory. Scale 1:200000 topographic map. DOS 610 Series, Sheet W 64 60. Directorate of Overseas Surveys, Tolworth, UK, 1978.
 Antarctic Digital Database (ADD). Scale 1:250000 topographic map of Antarctica. Scientific Committee on Antarctic Research (SCAR). Since 1993, regularly upgraded and updated.

Notes

References
 Bulgarian Antarctic Gazetteer. Antarctic Place-names Commission. (details in Bulgarian, basic data in English)
 Matov Peak. SCAR Composite Gazetteer of Antarctica

External links
 Matov Peak. Copernix satellite image

Mountains of Graham Land
Bulgaria and the Antarctic
Davis Coast